Burwen is a village in Anglesey, Wales, in the community of Amlwch. Located on the A5025, it is 1 kilometre southwest of the larger village of Bull Bay and 2.2 kilometres west of the town of Amlwch.

Burwen contains the council cemetery of Amlwch, which was established in 1863.

External links 
photos of Burwen and surrounding area on geograph

References 

Villages in Anglesey
Amlwch